Yunnan Provincial Library (YPL), founded in 1909, is located in Kunming, China.

Yunnan Provincial Library was awarded Guust van Wesemael Literacy Prize 2005 by IFLA.

Use

The library has been used as the venue for various events including Yunfest, an independent film festival with some international participation that focuses on Yunnan, neighbouring countries and regions.

References

External links
Yunnan Provincial Library
ILAS

Libraries in Yunnan
Libraries established in 1909
Buildings and structures in Kunming